Laholm Bay is a bay of the Kattegat, between Tylösand in the north and Hovs Hallar in the south. The Bjäre Peninsula, which forms its southern edge, separates it from Skälder Bay.

The border between Halland and Skåne counties reaches the bay between Båstad and Hemmeslövstrand.

Mighty dunes separate the beach from the rest of the coastal area.

Along Laholm Bay are several seaside resorts: Båstad, Hemmeslövsstrand, Eskilstorpsstrand, Skummeslövsstrand, and Mellbystrand, among others.

The long sandy beach was used in the past as a country road, with bus traffic to Båstad already in the 1930s.

Laholm Bay suffers from eutrophication and related algal blooms. Since the 1970s, oxygen deficiency has been observed in groundwater. The cause of the environmental issues is thought to be too much nutrients (mainly nitrogen from agriculture, forests, and rivers) in relation to the shallow water depth. As of 2005, measures to reduce the supply of nitrogen have not yielded satisfactory results.

References

External links 

Bays of Sweden
Landforms of Halland County
Landforms of Skåne County